A Contraluz is an album by Uruguayan band La Vela Puerca that was produced by Gustavo Santaolalla. It was released in October 2004, after recording during March and April of that year.

Track listing
"Llenos de Magia" – 3:54
"Sin Palabras" – 3:24
"Dice" – 5:08
"De Atar" – 4:06
"Va a Escampar" – 4:43
"Escobas" – 4:01
"Clarobscuro" – 5:10
"Zafar" – 4:24
"Caldo Precoz" – 3:29
"Haciéndose Pasar por Luz" – 3:26
"En el Limbo" – 4:44
"Un Frasco" – 4:43
"Doble Filo" – 3:10
"A Lo Verde – 3:13

Personnel 
 Javier Casalla – string
 Sergio Dawi – baritone saxophone
 Bebe Ferreira – trombone
 Aníbal Kerpel – associate producer, Hammond organ
 Nicolas Lieutier – Bajo Sexto
 Carlos Antoni Mendez – guitar
 Carlos Morales – guitar
 Alejandro Piccone – trumpet
 Martin Pomares – assistant engineer, guitar
 Alejandro Terán – choir arrangement, string
 Julio Berta – mixing
 Juan Campodónico – production assistant
 Pepe Céspedes – producer
 Demian Chorovicz – engineer
 Jorge "Portugués" Da Silva – engineer
 Javier Mazzarol – assistant engineer
 Alejandro Pensa – drum technician
 Oscar Righi – producer
 Gustavo Santaolalla – producer
 Adrián Sosa – A&R

2004 albums
La Vela Puerca albums
Albums produced by Gustavo Santaolalla